Colebee is a suburb of Sydney, in the state of New South Wales, Australia. Colebee is located 47 kilometres west of the Sydney central business district, in the local government area of the City of Blacktown and is part of the Western Sydney region.

History
Colebee was named after C. Colebee who is believed to have been the first indigenous Australian to have been granted land in the Blacktown area, at Plumpton Ridge. He was the son of Yarramundi.

Heritage listings 
Colebee has a number of heritage-listed sites, including:
 Richmond Road: Colebee and Nurragingy Land Grant

References

Suburbs of Sydney
City of Blacktown